Fun with Mr. Future is a 1982 live-action/animated short film from Walt Disney Productions directed by Darrell Van Citters.

Plot
An Audio-Animatronic talking-head replica of Abraham Lincoln (voiced by Phil Proctor) hosts a tour of what the future will look like via retro-style animation.

Production
Fun with Mr. Future originally began development as an Epcot television special, whose crew included Darrell Van Citters, Mike Giamo, Joe Ranft, Mike Gabriel, Tad Stones, and Brian McEntee. At the time, this team was also involved in the development stages of what would become Sport Goofy in Soccermania (1987) and Who Framed Roger Rabbit (1988). After Disney shelved the Epcot special, Tom Wilhite allowed them to use footage from the project and edit it into a new animated short. The resulting work marked the directorial debut of animator Darrell Van Citters, who began his career at the Disney studios.

Release
Disney released the film in Los Angeles on October 27, 1982. No other public screenings took place until October 2010, when New York's Museum of Modern Art featured it in a program commemorating the publication of John Canemaker's book, Two Guys Named Joe. According to Tad Stones, "[Working on it] was a lot of fun but I couldn't even tell you where you find it now. It's one of those gems even Disney doesn't know it has. I went to a comic convention and was surprised to see its cels for sale."

See also
List of Disney animated shorts
 "There's A Great Big Beautiful Tomorrow" - sung at the end of the film
The Jetsons

References

External links

Fun With Mr. Future on YouTube
D23 article

1982 films
1982 animated films
Short films with live action and animation
1980s Disney animated short films
Fictional depictions of Abraham Lincoln in film
Films directed by Darrell Van Citters
Films with screenplays by Joe Ranft
Films about technology
1982 short films
1982 directorial debut films
1980s English-language films
1980s rediscovered films
Rediscovered American films